Galkayo is the capital of the north-central Mudug region of Somalia. The city of Galkacyo is divided into two administrative areas separated by a loose boundary.

Geographically Galkacyo is divided into four main quarters: Garsoor, Horumar, Israac, and Wadajir. Puntland fully controls Garsoor, Israac, and Horumar (The neutral areas are sited by the Old Galkayo market and the loose boundary, while Galmudug controls Wadajir in South .

Following independence, Galkacyo was made the center of the Galkayo District. The city has grown considerably in recent times and serves as a commercial hub. Population estimates range from 80,000 to 315,000.

History
Before independence Gaalkacyo was small town mainly inhibited by pastrolists, following the independence of Somalia in 1960, Galkayo was made the center of Galkayo District and the capital of Mudug region.

Geography

Location
Galkayo is situated in north-central Somalia, in the heart of the Mudug region. Nearby settlements include to the east Godad (7.1 nm), to the northeast Bali busle (16.2 nm), to the north Halobooqad (4.4 nm), to the northwest Beyra (12.8 nm), to the west Xera Jaale-bayra (23.8 nm), to the southwest Saaxo (30 nm), to the south Laascadale (10.2 nm), and to the southeast Arfuda (13.0 nm). The largest cities in the country most proximate to Galkayo are Hobyo (217 km), Garowe (219 km) and Qardho (358 km). Shimbiris, the highest peak in Somalia, is located some 432 km to the north in the Cal Madow mountain range.

Climate
Galkayo has a hot arid climate (Köppen BWh).

Administration

Galkayo is situated in the north-central part of Somalia, and is one of the most developed towns in the region. The city is divided into four main districts called Garsoor, Horumar, Israac, and Wadajir respectively. The Puntland Administration fully controls Garsoor, Israac, and Horumar (The neutral areas are sited by the Old Galkayo market and the loose boundary, while Galmudug controls Wadajir in the South.

Although relatively stable compared to southern Somalia, sporadic targeted assassination attempts by Al-Shabaab militants against Puntland public officials led in 2010–2011 to a police crackdown and comprehensive administrative reform. The Puntland and Galmudug administrations subsequently signed an accord in Garowe in February 2011, officially agreeing to cooperate on security, economic and social matters so as to strengthen inter-regional relations.

Services

A lively trading city, Galkayo is a center for local business. Hotels, guest houses, restaurants, supermarkets and newly erected office blocks earmarked for the government and NGOs line the streets, juxtaposed by the tall minarets of masjids. The city also offers numerous social services such as hospitals, petrol stops and police stations, with the former Somali Army barracks kept in good condition and renovated.

Moreover, Galkayo is a hub of calligraphic art, serving as a training ground of sorts for local visual artists. Elaborate murals and phrases in Arabic and English adorn the walls of the city's many office and shop buildings.

Demographics
In 2010, the Food and Agriculture Organization noted that population estimates for Galkayo ranged from 75,000 to 315,000, with a United Nations Development Programme estimate for 2005 being 105,000. The International Crisis Group gives a figure of 137,000 for 2015.

The Arab Salah, Habar Gidir, Leelkase, Awrtable, and Majeerteen are mainly the dominant in Galkayo.

The neighborhood of Wadajir in the southern area of the city, which is controlled by Galmudug, is mainly inhabited by the Sa'ad sub-division of the Habar Gidir, a Hawiye subclan and the Saleebaan Abdalle and Qubeys  both sub-divisions of the Surre Dir.

Education

Galkayo has a number of academic institutions. According to the Puntland Ministry of Education, there are 40 primary schools in the Galkayo District. Among these are the Axmed Guray school in Israac, named after Imam Ahmad ibn Ibrahim al-Ghazi (Ahmed Gurey); Al-Qudus in Horumar; and Barkhadle in Garsoor, built in honour of the 13th century scholar and saint Yusuf bin Ahmad al-Kawneyn (Aw Barkhadle). Puntland secondary schools in the area include Haji Ali Bihi, Cumar Samatar Secondary School (CSSS), Yasin Nor Hassan and Galkayo High. In addition, several new schools were opened in 2012.

Institutions of higher learning with a presence in the city include the Puntland State University, Puntland University of Science and Technology, Galkayo University, and Mudug University. East Africa University (EAU) also has a Galkayo branch, one of its seven campuses in Puntland.  Additionally, the public Galkayo Vocational Training Centre and the privately owned Mudug Vocational Training Center provide technical training.

Sports
Galkayo is home to Awale Stadium, a sporting facility that is named in memory of Mohammed Awale Liban, a Somali nationalist who designed the flag of Somalia in 1954. The stadium hosts many local football clubs, including FC YAMAYS, RPS FC, Dowladda Hoose FC, Comced FC, Homboboro FC, Telecom FC and Galcom FC.
In addition, the city also has another stadium Abdullahi Issa stadium in the South, named after Abdullahi Issa, the Prime Minister of Italian Somalia during the trusteeship period, serving from February 29, 1956, to July 1, 1960. Various courts built specifically for basketball and volleyball also exist in the city.

Transportation
Air transportation in Galacyo is served by the Abdullahi Yusuf Airport, operated by Puntland and Oshaco International Airport operated by Galmudug. Unlike Abdullahi Yusuf Airport, Oshaco International Airport does not have IATA and ICAO airport codes as it is not recognized by any international entity.
In September 2013, the Somali federal government signed an official cooperation agreement with its Chinese counterpart in Mogadishu as part of a five-year national recovery plan. The pact will see the Chinese authorities reconstruct several major infrastructural landmarks in the Somali capital and elsewhere, as well as the road linking Galkayo with Burao.

Media
Various media organizations are based in Galkayo. These include Radio Daljir, Radio Galmudug and Radio Codka-Mudug. Radio Gaalkacyo, formerly known as Radio Free Somalia, also broadcasts from the city.

Accommodation

Several establishments in Galkayo offer accommodation. Among these hotels and guest houses are the Kamaal Hotel, the Classic Hotel and Restaurant, and the Saylan Hotel. The Taar City Hotel is especially noted for its domesticated ostriches.

Neighborhoods
Galkayo consists of the following neighborhoods: Israac, Horumar, Garsoor and Wadajir.

Notable residents

 Abdullahi Yusuf Ahmed - President of Somalia (2004-2008) and Founding Father of Puntland state.
 Asha Gelle Dirie – former Minister of Women Development and Family Affairs of Puntland.
 Waris Dirie – model, actress, author and activist.
 Mohammed Awale Liban - Designer of the Flag of Somalia in 1954, born in eastern Galkacyo, Puntland.
 Ahmed Duale Gelle - President of Galmudug, businessman and former federal MP.
 Zakaria Mohamed Haji-Abdi – leader of the Alliance for the Re-liberation of Somalia.
 Abdulkadir Abdi Hashi – MP in Federal Parliament, and former State Minister of the Presidency for Planning and International Relations of Puntland.
 Abdirizak Haji Hussein – former Prime Minister of Somalia, and former Secretary General of the Somali Youth League.
 Abdi Bashiir Indhobuur - poet and playwright who composed of many patriotic songs.
 Mohamed Farrah Aidid, Chairman of the United Somali Congress that toppled Dictator Siad Barre, battled US Delta forces and UNOSOM during Operation Restore Hope and President of Somalia before his Death, 1987–1996
 Abdi Qeybdiid – former President of Galmudug, and former Interior Minister of Somalia.
 Ali Haji Warsame - First Director of Management at Port of Bosaso and presidential candidate at the Puntland presidential election, 2014.
 Mohamed Warsame Ali – first President of Galmudug, former Ambassador of Somalia to the US, former Minister of Commerce, Public Works, and Sports and Youth Affairs.

See also
Galmudug
Puntland

References

Further reading

External links

 
Populated places in Mudug
Galmudug
Puntland